A towpath is a road or trail on the bank of a river, canal, or other inland waterway. The purpose of a towpath is to allow a land vehicle, beasts of burden, or a team of human pullers to tow a boat, often a barge. This mode of transport was common where sailing was impractical due to tunnels and bridges, unfavourable winds, or the narrowness of the channel.

After the Industrial Revolution, towing became obsolete when engines were fitted on boats and when railway transportation superseded the slow towing method. Since then, many of these towpaths have been converted to multi-use trails. They are still named towpaths — although they are now only occasionally used for the purpose of towing boats.

History
Early inland waterway transport used the rivers, and while barges could use sails to assist their passage when winds were favourable or the river was wide enough to allow tacking, in many cases this was not possible, and gangs of men were used to bow-haul the boats. As river banks were often privately owned, such teams worked their way along the river banks as best they could, but this was far from satisfactory. On British rivers such as the River Severn, the situation was improved by the creation of towing path companies in the late 1700s. They were not universally popular, however, as tolls were charged for their use, to recoup the capital cost, and this was resented on rivers where barge traffic had previously been free.

With the advent of artificial canals, most of them were constructed with towpaths suitable for horses. Many rivers were improved by artificial cuts, and this often gave an opportunity to construct a towing path at the same time. Even so, the River Don Navigation was improved from Tinsley to Rotherham in 1751, but the horse towing path was not completed on this section until 1822. On the River Avon between Stratford-upon-Avon and Tewkesbury, a towpath was never provided, and bow-hauling continued until the 1860s, when steam tugs were introduced.

While towing paths were most convenient when they stayed on one side of a canal, there were occasions where it had to change sides, often because of opposition from landowners. Thus the towpath on the Chesterfield Canal changes to the south bank while it passes through the Osberton Estate, as the Foljambes, who lived in Osberton Hall, did not want boatmen passing too close to their residence. On canals, one solution to the problem of getting the horse to the other side was the roving bridge or turnover bridge, where the horse ascended the ramp on one side, crossed the bridge, descended a circular ramp on the other side of the river but the same side of the bridge, and then passed through the bridge hole to continue on its way. This had the benefit that the rope did not have to be detached while the transfer took place. Where the towpath reached a lock, which was spanned by a footbridge at its tail, the southern section of the Stratford-on-Avon Canal used split bridges so that the horse line did not have to be detached. The rope passed through a small gap at the centre of the bridge between its two halves.

One problem with the horse towing path where it passed under a bridge was abrasion of the rope on the bridge arch. This resulted in deep grooves being cut in the fabric of the bridge, and in many cases, the structure was protected by cast iron plates, attached to the faces of the arch. These too soon developed deep grooves, but could be more easily replaced than the stonework of the bridge. While bridges could be constructed over relatively narrow canals, they were more costly on wide navigable rivers, and in many cases horse ferries were provided, to enable the horse to reach the next stretch of towpath. In more recent times, this has provided difficulties for walkers, where an attractive river-side walk cannot be followed because the towpath changes sides and the ferry is no more.

Not all haulage was by horses, and an experiment was carried out on the Middlewich Branch of the Shropshire Union Canal in 1888. Following suggestions by Francis W. Webb, the Mechanical Engineer for the London and North Western Railway at Crewe Works, rails were laid along a  stretch of the towpath near Worleston, and a small steam locomotive borrowed from Crewe Works was used to tow boats. The locomotive ran on  gauge tracks, and was similar to Pet, which is preserved in the National Railway Museum at York. The canal's engineer, G. R. Webb, produced a report on the expected costs of laying rails along the towpaths, but nothing more was heard of the project, and the advent of steam and diesel powered boats offered a much simpler solution. The 'mules' which assist ships through the locks of the Panama Canal are a modern example of the concept.

Modern usage
Towpaths are popular with cyclists and walkers, and some are suitable for equestrians. In snowy winters they are popular in the US with cross-country skiers and snowmobile users.

Although historically not designed or used as towpaths, acequia ditch banks also are popular recreational trails.

Britain
In Britain, most canals were built, owned and operated by private companies, and the towpaths were deemed to be private, for the benefit of legitimate users of the canal. The nationalisation of the canal system in 1948 did not result in the towpaths becoming public rights of way. Subsequent legislation, such as the Transport Act 1968, which defined the government's obligations to the maintenance of the inland waterways for which it was now responsible, did not include any commitment to maintain towpaths for use by anyone, however, some ten years later British Waterways started to relax the rule that a permit was required to give access to a towpath, and began to encourage leisure usage by walkers, anglers and in some areas, cyclists. The steady development of the leisure use of the canals and the decline of commercial traffic has resulted in a general acceptance that towpaths are open to everyone, and not just boat users.

The concept of free access to towpaths is now enshrined in the legislation which transferred responsibility for the English and Welsh canals from British Waterways to the Canal & River Trust in 2012. Cycling permits are no longer required by the Canal & River Trust. However, not all canal towpaths are suitable for use by cyclists, and conflicts can arise between the differing user groups, leading to campaigns such as Stay Kind, Slow Down.  Parts of some towpaths have been incorporated into the National Cycle Network, and in most cases this has resulted in the surface being improved.

List of towpaths
Illinois and Michigan Canal
Chesapeake and Ohio Canal Trail
Forth to Firth Canal Pathway along route of the Falkirk Wheel.
D&R Canal Trail
Thames Path
Erie Canal
Augusta Canal
Ohio and Erie Canal Towpath Trail
Ohio to Erie Trail
Central Canal Towpath, Indianapolis, Indiana
Louisville Loop
Pennsylvania Canal (Delaware Division)
Lehigh Canal
Leeds and Liverpool Canal

See also

Horse-drawn boat
Flatboat
Flyboat
Narrowboat
The Volunteer (replica canal boat at LaSalle, Illinois)
Trekschuit (literally "tugboat") — horse-drawn boat used in the Netherlands
Burlak — Russian name for a person hauling barges

References

Bibliography

External links

 Towpath Cycling in the UK

Types of thoroughfares
Footpaths
Canals
Water transport infrastructure